Jean Droste (born 21 January 1994) is a South African professional rugby union player for the  in the Currie Cup and the  in the Rugby Challenge. His regular position is lock, but he can also play as a flanker.

Rugby career

2007–2014 : Youth rugby / Blue Bulls

Droste was born in Pretoria. He was selected to represent the Pretoria-based  as early as primary school level, when he played for them at the 2007 Under-13 Craven Week. He didn't win any call-ups at high school level, but joined the Blue Bulls academy after finishing school.

He made nine starts and two appearances as a replacement in the s' Under-19 Provincial Championship campaign in 2013, appearing both as a lock and a flanker.

He found his involvement more limited for the s in the 2014 Under-21 Provincial Championship, making just one start and three appearances off the bench. One of those were in their 23–19 semi-final win over the s, but he didn't feature in the final, in which the Blue Bulls beat  20–10 in Cape Town.

2015–present : Sharks and UKZN Impi

At the end of October 2016, Droste was included in the  Super Rugby squad for the 2017 season.

References

South African rugby union players
Living people
1994 births
Rugby union players from Pretoria
Rugby union locks
Rugby union flankers
Sharks (Currie Cup) players
Sharks (rugby union) players
Kubota Spears Funabashi Tokyo Bay players
Blue Bulls players
Green Rockets Tokatsu players
Free State Cheetahs players
Cheetahs (rugby union) players
Munakata Sanix Blues players